Man from Interpol is a 1960 TV series produced by The Danzigers.  The NBC series was filmed in England and the music was scored by jazz musician Tony Crombie.

Premise
Anthony Smith, an agent based at Britain's Interpol Division at Scotland Yard, takes on international assignments dealing with murderers, drug smugglers and slave runners.

Cast
Richard Wyler as Interpol Agent Anthony Smith
John Longden as Superintendent Mercer
John Serret as Inspector Gouthier / Inspector Frenay ( French Police Chief)
Peter Allenby as Ricardi, of the Italian Carabineri

Reception
According to BFI Screenonline "this uneasy attempt to graft a youthful hero (Wyler's boyish projection) on to a rugged crime-buster framework usually associated with more mature leading characters - Charles Korvin's Inspector Duval in the 1959-60 series Interpol Calling (ITV), for instance - gave The Man from Interpol little more than an air of tired hysteria."

References

External links
The Man from Interpol at CTVA
The Man from Interpol at IMDb

1960s British drama television series
1960 British television series debuts
1960 British television series endings
1960s British crime television series
Television shows shot at New Elstree Studios